The 2023 Cadel Evans Great Ocean Road Race was a road cycling race that was held on 29 January 2023 in Geelong, Australia. It was the seventh edition of the Cadel Evans Great Ocean Road Race and the second event of the 2023 UCI World Tour.

Teams
Fourteen teams entered the race, including eleven of the eighteen UCI WorldTeams, two UCI ProTeams and the Australian national team. Of the starting peloton of 94 riders, 83 finished.

UCI WorldTeams

 
 
 
 
 
 
 
 
 
 
 

UCI ProTeams

 
 

National Teams

 Australia

Result

References

External links
 

Cadel Evans Great Ocean Road Race
Cadel Evans Great Ocean Road Race
Cadel Evans Great Ocean Road Race
Cadel Evans Great Ocean Road Race